Wu Ming, Chinese for "anonymous", is a pseudonym for a group of Italian authors formed in 2000 from a subset of the Luther Blissett community in Bologna.
Four of the group earlier wrote the novel Q (first edition 1999). Unlike the open name "Luther Blissett", "Wu Ming" stands for a defined group of writers active in literature and popular culture. The band authored several novels, some of which have been translated in many countries.

Their books are seen as part of a body of literary works (the "nebula", as it is frequently called in Italy) described as the New Italian Epic, a phrase that was proposed by Wu Ming.

Meaning of the name
In Chinese, "wu ming" can mean "anonymous" or, with a different tone on the first syllable, "five people" (名 is a measure word), the pun being part of the reason the collective adopted the name. The name is meant both as a tribute to dissidents ("Wu Ming" is a common byline among Chinese citizens demanding democracy and freedom of speech) and as a rejection of the celebrity-making machine which turns the author into a star. "Wu Ming" is also a reference to the third sentence in the Daodejing: "Heaven and Earth's nameless origin".

The group has since grown to include more than five members. As a result, "anonymous" became the preferred interpretation of the name.

Members and public personae

The members of Wu Ming are typically known as "Wu Ming 1", "Wu Ming 2", "Wu Ming 3", "Wu Ming 4", and "Wu Ming 5". Their real names are not secret, though:

Roberto Bui (Wu Ming 1)
Giovanni Cattabriga (Wu Ming 2)
Luca Di Meo (Wu Ming 3 – He left the group in the spring of 2008)
Federico Guglielmi (Wu Ming 4) [Not to be confused with the Italian music journalist of the same name]
Riccardo Pedrini (Wu Ming 5 – He left the group in the summer of 2015)

The five authors do extensive book tours (which they describe as "almost gratefuldeadesque") and frequently appear in public. However, they refuse to be photographed or filmed by the media. Even on their official website, they do not provide any pictures of themselves. Here is how Wu Ming 1 explained the group's stance in a 2007 interview:

In Wu Ming's official biographical page (Italian version), the collective denies rumors they once beat up a press photographer:

54

54 is a complex novel about popular culture, the shattered dreams of the Italian Resistance, and the relationship between Europe and America.

Background research began in 1999, after the publication of the group's previous novel Q. Plots were outlined in the aftermath of the Kosovo war. Actual writing work ended ten days after 11 September, on the eve of the war in Afghanistan. These two wars are explicitly referred to in the novel's End Titles: "Begun in May 1999, during the Nato bombings of Belgrade. Delivered to the Italian publishers on September 21, 2001, awaiting the escalation". The events leading to (and following) 11 September are also allegorically described in the book's forenote.

54 was published in Italy in the springtime of 2002. In the following months, Wu Ming collaborated with Italian folk-rock band Yo Yo Mundi, whose ensuing concept album 54 (2004) was directly inspired from the novel.

Radio Alice / Working Slowly

Wu Ming is also credited as co-writers for the screenplay of the Italian film Lavorare con lentezza (aka Radio Alice), directed by Guido Chiesa, released in Italy in 2004.

The original title means "Working slowly" and cites a protest song, a popular leftist anthem in the 1970s: "Work slowly / And effortlessly / Work may hurt you / And send you to the hospital / Where there's no bed left / And you may even die. / Work slowly / And effortlessly / Health is priceless." (Translated by Wu Ming)

The film is set during a student uprising that paralysed Bologna for several days in March 1977. Several narrative threads are woven around Radio Alice, the station run by the "creative wing" (the so-called "Mao-Dadaists") of the radical Autonomia movement. In the morning of 11 March a brawl involving radical and catholic students escalated to a full-scale riot in the university district. The Carabinieri riot squad attacked and shot down a 25-year-old student called Francesco Lorusso. As a result, thousands of students and activists stormed the centre of the town, clashing with the police and throwing molotov cocktails. On 13 March the premises of Radio Alice were invaded and vandalised by the police, the station was shut down and every member of the staff was arrested. The film tells the story mixing real anecdotes with semi-fictional characters.

Radio Alice has won several awards and prizes at movie festivals all over Europe, including the Marcello Mastroianni Award for the Best Young Actors at the 2004 Venice Film Festival and the First Prize at the 2005 Festival de Cinema Politic in Barcelona, Spain.

Manituana

Manituana is the third of Wu Ming's collectively authored novels. It was written in the 2003–07 period and published in Italy in 2007. It is the first episode of an 18th-century pan-Atlantic trilogy which the authors call "the Atlantic Triptych". All novels will be set in the 1770s, all across the Atlantic Ocean (North America, Europe, the West Indies and Africa), before and during the American Revolution.

In the springtime of 2007, Manituana reached No. 4 in the Italian best-seller charts The English translation was published in the UK and the US by Verso Books in the Fall of 2009.

In an entry on their weblog, Wu Ming wrote that

The novel is set in the years 1775–1783 in New York's Mohawk Valley, Quebec and London (UK). Among the many real historical chapters that populate the book, the most important ones are Joseph Brant, war chief of the Mohawk nation, and Molly Brant, a matron of the Wolf clan in the Iroquois Six Nations.

In Italy Manituana was awarded the Premio Sergio Leone 2007 and the Premio Emilio Salgari 2008. In November 2010 it was nominated for International Dublin Literary Award.

Altai
In May 2009 Wu Ming announced that they had almost finished writing a new book, entitled Altai, set "in [their debut novel] Q's world and historical continuum". "After this accomplishment", they added, "we'll go back to the Atlantic Triptych." Later on, they explained:

The novel, entitled Altai, was published in Italy on 20 November 2009 and immediately reached No. 5 in the national list of best-sellers.

Solo novels

Starting from 2001, each individual member of Wu Ming also authored one or more "solo" novels. Some of them have been translated into other languages, but not yet in English.

Wu Ming 1 is the author of New Thing (2004), an "unidentified narrative object" blending fiction, journalism and free verse. It is an allegorical tale on free jazz and the 1960s, set in 1967 New York City and constructed around John Coltrane's final days. The French newspaper Le Monde described the book as "a choral novel, an inquiry, and a political jam-session loaded with syncopated poetry".

Wu Ming 2 is the author of Guerra agli umani [War on the Humans] (2004), a satire of primitivism and survivalism set on the Apennines in an undefined year. The main character and narrator is called Marco, but he nicknames himself "Marco Walden", after Thoreau's Walden. At the beginning of the book, Marco quits his job as a restroom cleaner at a big cemetery, because he wants to leave the city (presumably Bologna, although it remains unnamed), go to the mountains and become a "hunter-gatherer superhero".

Wu Ming 4 is the author of Stella del mattino [Morning Star] (2008). The novel is set in 1919 Oxford and centered around T.E. Lawrence suffering writer's block while working on The Seven Pillars of Wisdom. Among the characters Lawrence encounters in the book, important roles are played by writers J.R.R. Tolkien, C.S. Lewis and, most notably, Robert Graves. Wu Ming themselves described Stella del mattino as "the best solo novel ever manufactured in our smithy" and "a bridge between our collective and solo novels".

Wu Ming 5 is the author of both Havana Glam (2001) and Free Karma Food (2007). Havana Glam is set in an alternate 1970s world where David Bowie is a communist sympathizer and has a "Cuban period" instead of a "Berlin period". This causes some turmoil in Havana, as the Cuban intelligence suspect the rockstar to be an infiltrator. Free Karma Food describes a future society where all kinds of cattle have been killed by a global pandemic known as "The Great Murrain". Some Italian critics described Wu Ming 5's novels as belonging to the literary subgenre known as "New Weird". Such inclusion, however, has been questioned in weblogs and social network discussion groups devoted to science-fiction.

Other activities

Wu Ming 1 is the Italian translator of several Elmore Leonard novels. He translated Cat Chaser, Freaky Deaky, Tishomingo Blues and Mr Paradise, and wrote an essay on how to render Leonard's prose into Italian The essay was published in the catalogue of the 2006 Courmayer Noir in Festival, at which Leonard was presented with the Raymond Chandler Award. Wu Ming 1 also translated one Walter Mosley novel, Little Scarlet. In 2010 he became the Italian translator of Stephen King's books.

Wu Ming 2 has written the theater play Razza Partigiana in 2013; he is also participating on stage, with musical support from Paul Pieretto, Federico Oppi (Settlefish) and Egle Sommacal (Massimo Volume). The plot follows the story of Giorgio Marincola, a partisan from World War II, a dark-skinned Italian who is the son of a Somalian mother and an Italian father, born in 1923 near Mogadishu.

Wu Ming 5 was guitar player in :it:Nabat, one of the first Oi! bands to reach a cult following in Italy during the early 1980s. The band broke up in 1987 but got together again in the early 1990s, only to break up again in 1998. Nabat reunited in 2010 for a comeback tour, with Wu Ming 5 still on guitar, "splitting services between two bands [Wu Ming and Nabat]", as he quipped during a radio interview.

Bibliography
The group has published several novels and non-fiction books in print and online, released under a Creative Commons license, and they are available for download on the group's website. Q, 54, Manituana Altai and Morning Star have been translated into English. Most books are available in several European languages.

Fiction written by the whole collective
Q (originally written as Luther Blissett, 1999, published in 18 languages)
Hatchets of War (with Vitaliano Ravagli, 2000)
54 (2002). Translated into English, Spanish, Portuguese (Brazilian), Dutch, German and Serbian.
Manituana (2007, Translated into English, Spanish and French)
Weather Forecasts (a novella, 2008)
Altai (2009, Translated into English)
Clockwork Orange Duck (collection of short stories, 2011)
The Army of Sleepwalkers (2014)
Cantalamappa (2015)
The Invisible Everywhere (2015)
The Return of Cantalamappa (2017)
Proletkult (2018)
Ufo 78 (2022)

Solo fiction
Havana Glam (by Wu Ming 5, 2001)
War on the Humans (by Wu Ming 2, 2004). Translated into Dutch and French
New Thing (by Wu Ming 1, 2004). Translated into Portuguese (Brazilian), Spanish and French
Free Karma Food (by Wu Ming 5, 2006)
Morning Star (by Wu Ming 4, 2008)
Pontiac: History of a Revolt (by Wu Ming 2, book + cd, 2010)
One Shot is Enough (by Wu Ming 2, book + cd, 2010)

Non-fiction
This Revolution Has No Face (2002). A Spanish anthology of articles and short stories
Giap! (2003). An anthology of essays, articles, e-mail conversations and short stories
Grand River: A Journey (2008)
New Italian Epic (a collection of essays on literature, 2009)
The Path of Gods (by Wu Ming 2, 2010)
The Imperfect Hero (by Wu Ming 4, 2010)
Thomas Munster: Sermon to the Princes (2010). Asks why Muntzer's reformation has inspired radicals for almost 500 years. Part of the "Revolutions" series.
No Promise This Trip Will Be Short: 25 Years of No Tav Struggle (2016)

Books written by a Wu Ming member with an external co-author
Timira (with Antar Mohamed, 2012)
Point Lenana (with Roberto Santachiara, 2013)

References

External links
Official website's biographical page in English.
Wu Ming's English language blog
 A Life in Writing: Wu Ming, a profile of the collective published in The Guardian, 14 November 2009.
A very extensive and detailed interview with the Wu Ming Foundation, conducted by professor Henry Jenkins and published on his blog in two installments, Part 1 and Part 2.

In 2006 Chicago Review published two stories ("In Like Flynn" and "The Emperor's Three Hundred Woodcutters") by and an interview with Wu Ming.

Collective pseudonyms
Copyright activists
Italian artist groups and collectives
21st-century Italian novelists
Literary collaborations
Creative Commons-licensed authors